, born  is a Japanese actor. He won the award for best supporting actor at the 15th Hochi Film Award for Rōnin-gai.

Filmography

Film

Television

Video game
 Yakuza: Dead Souls - Oyassan

References

External links
 
 Renji Ishibashi at MSN Movies

Japanese male actors
1941 births
Living people
People from Shinagawa